Rita Ridley (née Lincoln; 4 November 1946 – 12 February 2013) was an English middle- and long-distance runner.

Biography
She started in athletics at school in Essex with her twin sister Iris. Aged 18, she finished second to Joyce Smith in the mile race at the WAAA Championships. She won the following year in a championship record time of 4:47.9, retained the national mile title in 1967 and won the newly introduced 1500 metres in 1968, 1970 and 1971. She won the national cross country championships in 1969, 1970, 1971, 1972 and 1974. In 1974 she also won a bronze medal in the IAAF World Cross Country Championships.

In 1969, she achieved a British record time of 4:15.9 in the 1500 m and she set a new record of 4:15.4 in 1970 and then 4:14.3 and 4:12.65 in 1971. In December 1968 she was the first British woman to break 10 minutes in the 3000 metres with a time of 9:59.6.

She represented England and won the gold medal in the 1,500 metres at the 1970 Commonwealth Games in Edinburgh. In a fiercely contested race, New Zealand's Sylvia Potts tripped and fell just one metre from the finish line, with Ridley avoiding the falling athlete on her outside, to take the title.

Rita trained as a PE teacher at All Saints College in North London and gained a BEd with Hons from London University at All in 1980.

Death
Ridley died of cancer at the age of 66 in 2013.

References

1946 births
2013 deaths
Place of birth missing
Place of death missing
Sportspeople from Essex
British female long-distance runners
English female long-distance runners
English female middle-distance runners
Commonwealth Games gold medallists for England
Commonwealth Games medallists in athletics
Athletes (track and field) at the 1970 British Commonwealth Games
Deaths from cancer in England
Medallists at the 1970 British Commonwealth Games